Molain may refer to the following places in France:

 Molain, Aisne, a commune in the department of Aisne
 Molain, Jura, a commune in the department of Jura